was a Japanese judoka.

He was born in Fukuno, Toyama and began judo at the age of 5.

After graduating from Tenri University, Minatoya coached judo at the dojo wichi Anton Geesink managed in Netherlands.

In 1969, Minatoya participated in the World Championships in Mexico City and won a gold medal, defending his world championship.

Minatoya retired in 1972, when he was defeated by Toyokazu Nomura at the All-Japan Selected Judo Championships and missed the participation of the Olympic Games held in Munich.

From 1967 to 2009, he also coached judo at Kanazawa Institute of Technology in Kanazawa, Ishikawa.

Achievements
1965 - World Championships (-68 kg) 2nd
1967 - World Championships (-70 kg) 1st
1968 - All-Japan Selected Championships (Half-Lightweight) 3rd
1969 - World Championships (-70 kg) 1st
 - All-Japan Championships (Openweight only) loss
 - All-Japan Selected Championships (Lightweight) 1st
1970 - All-Japan Selected Championships (Lightweight) 1st
 - All-Japan Championships (Openweight only) loss
1971 - World Championships (-70 kg) 2nd
 - All-Japan Selected Championships (Lightweight) 3rd
1972 - All-Japan Selected Championships (Lightweight) 2nd

References

External links
 

Japanese male judoka
1943 births
2016 deaths
People from Toyama Prefecture
20th-century Japanese people
21st-century Japanese people